The Kawasaki Ninja 250R (codenamed EX250; previous generations had market-specific names) is a motorcycle in the Ninja sport bike series from the Japanese manufacturer Kawasaki originally introduced in 1986. As the marque's entry-level sport bike, the motorcycle has undergone few changes throughout its quarter-century lifetime, having received only three substantial redesigns. In some markets the Ninja 250R has been succeeded by the Ninja 300.

Nomenclature 
Since 2008, the bike is marketed as the Ninja 250R in all markets. It is also referred to by its platform designation, EX250, to which a generational suffix is attached. In the United States, previous models (EX250-E/F/G/H) were already being marketed as members of the Ninja family of sport bikes, while outside of the U.S. the bike was known variously as the ZZR-250, ZX-250, or as the GPX-250R. One of the earliest models, the EX250-C, was given the name GPZ-250.

Model history 

The Ninja 250R's particular ergonomics, chassis design, and engine placement have resulted in a motorcycle that straddles the standard and sport classes. The Ninja's riding posture also falls between standard and sport.

1983–1985 (EX250-C) 
The first generation was produced between 1983 and 1985, and known by the production number EX250-C. It was sold as the GPZ-250. Sold only in its home market of Japan, this earliest, belt-driven version was first produced in 1983, and shares no commonality with later generations. The bike has 32 mm fork tubes.

1986–1987 (EX250-E) 
Produced between 1986 and 1987 was the EX250-E. This model was sold as the Ninja 250R in Canada and the U.S. between 1986 and 1987. It was known as the GPZ-250R elsewhere. When originally introduced, it was more costly than the Honda Rebel, and reviewers complained that while the 14,000 rpm redline was nice, the engine was slow to rev.

1988–2007 (EX250-F/EX250-G/EX250-H) 

For the 1988 model year, there were both cosmetic changes and changes in engine tuning. While the bore and stroke, and other major engine components, were unchanged, minor tuning adjustments were made. Reviewers  reported that this made the engine more free-revving, reaching the high 14,000 redline more quickly, and the tested top speed increased by a few miles per hour. The new, more fully enclosed bodywork was complimented for being stylish, at the time, and easily mistaken for the larger Ninja 750.

The third generation of production of the Ninja 250R encompassed three models:

 EX250-F - The most widespread EX250 variant, the E model was completely revamped and sold as the F model between 1988 and 2007 in the United States. Canada received the model between 1988 and 1999, and it was available elsewhere as the GPX-250R as early as 1987.

 EX250-G - Sold only in its home market of Japan, this version was known as the GPX-250R-II. It had dual front brakes and a wider wheel and tire (110/80-16). All other parts were identical to the -F model. It was sold after 1988.
 EX250-H - This model came to Canada as the Ninja 250R between 2000 and 2002, after which it received a new name: ZZR-250, in line with the -H model's name elsewhere in the world, where it had existed since 1992. This motorcycle has parts in common with the -F model, though it shares the same engine, albeit with different casings. It sports a lateral aluminum frame, a different fairing (designed to make it look sportier), larger 17-inch wheels, an adjustable rear shock absorber, adjustable brake and clutch levers, a smaller drive sprocket, computer-controlled timing advance, and a revised electrical system. It also had a smaller carburetor, & slightly different compression ratio, both of which were designed for quicker revving and slightly higher top end power. However, these upgrades came at a 6 kg weight gain.

2008–2012 (EX250-J) 

In 2008, Kawasaki gave the EX250 its most extensive redesign in twenty years. The EX250-J model is known as the Ninja 250R worldwide, regardless of market.

Parts from the third generation are still found on the -J, but its redesigned exterior panels bring the Ninja's appearance out of the 1990s and into line with late-2000s sportbikes. The engine and drivetrain retain 30% of the -F model's parts, according to Kawasaki. The engine's compression and maximum torque have been lowered to provide better midrange performance. The redesign of the engine resulted in improvements in engine response at low engine speeds, making the bike smoother and "much easier to ride."

The U.S. -J model uses dual carburetors like the -F model, but the European, Brazilian and Thai models have fuel injection. The wheels were increased in size to 17 inches, the front suspension was improved, and the brake rotors were replaced with a larger petal shape. On the carbureted version, a fuel gauge was added in place of the temperature gauge. With the additional and redesigned equipment, the EX250-J suffered a  increase in wet weight over its predecessors.

With the arrival of the EX250-J, manufacturing continues to be located in Thailand.

2013–2017 (EX250-L/EX250-M) 

The 2013 Ninja 250R had a new bodywork, twin headlights, a digital instruments cluster, new wheels with a wider  rear tire, and a reworked engine and exhaust. ABS is available as an option. Like the previous generation, the engine is fuel injected in some markets and carbureted in others. For 2013, in some markets, the Ninja 250R was replaced by the  Ninja 300 (EX300), while in others they are sold alongside each other.

2018– (EX250-P) 

At the 2017 Tokyo Motor Show, Kawasaki introduced the 2018 Ninja 250R along with the all-new 2018 Ninja 400, with the latter to be sold in Europe and America, replacing the Ninja 300.

See also 
 Kawasaki Ninja series

References

External links

Ninja 250R at Kawasaki USA

Ninja 250R
Sport bikes
Motorcycles introduced in 2008
Motorcycles powered by straight-twin engines